Leonard ("Leo") Myles-Mills (born May 9, 1973, in Accra, Greater Accra Region) is a Ghanaian former athlete who specialized in the 100 metres. He ran a personal best of 9.98 seconds for the event in 1998, becoming the first Ghanaian to break the 10-second barrier. His best of 6.45 seconds for the 60 metres is an African record. Myles-Mills twice represented his country at the Summer Olympics and also at the Commonwealth Games. He was a two-time NCAA Men's 100 m dash champion while running for Brigham Young University.

His brother John Myles-Mills was also a sprint athlete.

He has won a gold medal at the 1999 All-Africa Games, a silver medal at the 2003 All-Africa Games and a bronze medal at the 1998 African Championships. In 1999 he set a new African indoor record in 60 metres with 6.45 seconds. His personal best over 100 metres; 9.98 seconds was a Ghanaian record until Benjamin Azamati broke it by running a time of 9.97 seconds in 100 meters at the Texas relays on 26 March 2021.

Participating in the 2004 Summer Olympics, he achieved a third place in the 100 metres, thus securing qualification from his heat in a season's best time. Entering the second round, he managed to qualify through to the semi-final, following a third place in the race and recording a further improvement upon his season's best. He finished the semi-final in sixth place, thus failing to secure qualification to the final.

Myles-Mills is a member of the Church of Jesus Christ of Latter-day Saints.

International competitions

See also
List of Brigham Young University alumni

References

External links

Alumni of the Accra Academy
1973 births
Living people
Sportspeople from Accra
Ghanaian male sprinters
Olympic athletes of Ghana
Athletes (track and field) at the 2000 Summer Olympics
Athletes (track and field) at the 2004 Summer Olympics
Commonwealth Games competitors for Ghana
Athletes (track and field) at the 1998 Commonwealth Games
Athletes (track and field) at the 2006 Commonwealth Games
World Athletics Championships athletes for Ghana
Black Mormons
BYU Cougars men's track and field athletes
Ghanaian Latter Day Saints
African Games gold medalists for Ghana
African Games medalists in athletics (track and field)
Athletes (track and field) at the 1999 All-Africa Games
Athletes (track and field) at the 2003 All-Africa Games